André Latarjet (1877–1947) was a French physician.  In 1933, at the 2nd International AIMS (FIMS) Congress, he was elected President of the organization which would become the International Federation of Sports Medicine, the World agency for sports medicine.

References

20th-century French physicians
French anatomists
Academic staff of the University of Lyon
1877 births
1947 deaths
Physicians from Dijon